Margaret Island, founded in 2014, is a Hungarian indie pop band, named after Margaret Island in Budapest. Their pop songs are combined with acoustic and folk elements. Their music is influenced by Mumford & Sons and Passenger. Their first album, Egyszer volt, was released in September 2015. The album includes the song Nem voltál jó, which was originally in English, Soaked in life, later translated to Hungarian by János Bródy. They are currently signed to Gold Record. They performed as the interval act for the first heat for A Dal 2017, the national selection for Hungary in the Eurovision Song Contest 2017, as well as the interval act for the second heat for A Dal 2018.

Members
 Viki Lábas – singing
 Kristóf Törőcsik – bass guitar
 Bálint Füstös – guitar
 Dániel Gerendás – drums
 Kurszán Koltay – piano
 Tamás Verók – guitar

Awards
 2014: Our Voice Grand Prix Hungary
 2014: Joy of Music Award - Breakthrough Performance of the Year musical (Bálint Füstös)
 2015: Bolyongó was number one for several weeks on Petőfi Rádió.
 2015: Csillagtalan and Eső were, for several months, high on the hit list of Class FM.
 2016:  Fonogram award - Discovery of the Year - Egyszer volt (Gold Record)

References

External links
 Margaret Island on Facebook
 Official website on Golden Records
 A dalok.hu weboldal ismertetője

Hungarian pop music groups
2014 establishments in Hungary